Pribislav-Henry (d. 1150) was a Slavic Christian prince and the last ruler of the Hevelli (Stodorani) tribe in the Northern March of Brandenburg. His reign started, probably supported by the Ascanians, after the prior Hevelli prince Meinfried had been murdered in 1127. Having no sons of his own, he around 1129 gave the area between Brandenburg and Lehnin to his son-in-law, who was the oldest son of Albert the Bear. Emperor Lothair III approved the gift and made Albert margrave of the Northern March in 1134. In 1150, Pribislav Henry died and was succeeded, after a short war of succession, by Albert the Bear.

References

1150 deaths
Polabian Slavs
Medieval princes
Year of birth unknown
12th-century rulers in Europe